Ben Mary Muwanga (sometimes referred to as Benny Muwanga or Mary Ben Muwanga) is a Ugandan netball coach most notable for leading the She Cranes to the 1979 Netball World Championships in Trinidad and Tobago. She was also the national team coach between 1975 - 1985.

Background and education 
Ben Mary Muwanga was born in Kibibi, Butambala in 1943 to Erisa Muwanga and Julian Nanyanzi. Ben Mary Muwanga is a trained teacher and studied at Mitala Maria Primary School and Mount Saint Mary's College Namagunga before proceeding to Nkozi Teacher Training College.

Netball career 
She started playing the sport while in school at Mount Saint Mary's College Namagunga, and later signed for Kampala Women's Club. By her own admission, she joined the She Cranes as a player in 1964 and played one year with the national team. After completing coaching courses in 1969, she was appointed assistant coach for the She Cranes, deputizing Miriam Kibirango.

Upon being appointed She Cranes head coach in 1975, she guided the team to win 3 CECAFA Netball titles in 1975, 1981 and  1982. She also served as the team manager and Assistant Secretary to the Uganda Netball Federation. She retired from her post as She Cranes Head Coach in 1985 and then worked as an assistant Sports Officer for Mukono District till 2004.

Other sports 
In addition to being a netball coach and player, Mary Ben is also a qualified coach in netball, handball, basketball and athletics.

Personal life 
As of 2013, it was reported that she had 2 children, a son and a daughter. She lives in the Kampala suburb of Kabowa.

References 

Netball coaches
Ugandan sports coaches
Ugandan netball players
Sportspeople from Kampala
Living people
People educated at Mount Saint Mary's College Namagunga
Ugandan sportswomen
Year of birth missing (living people)